Nickelodeon (commonly shortened to Nick) is a British pay television network aimed at children and young aged 5 to 14.

On 1 September 1993, a localised version of the US channel launched in the United Kingdom and launched at a later date in Ireland. In the United Kingdom, the channel was available on Sky, Virgin Media, and TalkTalk Plus TV. In Ireland, the channel is available on Virgin Media Ireland, Eir TV and Sky Ireland. It is the first Nickelodeon feed launched overseas.

History
 

Nickelodeon was launched in the UK on 1 September 1993 exclusively on Sky as part of the Sky Multichannels package, originally airing for 12 hours from 7am to 7pm. and showing both cartoons and live action series.  The first cartoon was James the Cat. Nick@Nite was also planned from early 1994 but never implemented; off-air Nickelodeon would air static logos, schedule information and teletext.  From November 1995, it started to timeshare with Paramount Channel.

The British version of Nick Jr. also launched on the channel's first day, broadcasting during school hours. Live presentation followed in 1994, branded as Nick Alive!.  In 1996, Nickelodeon reached an agreement with CBBC to show a block of CBBC programmes for one hour before and one hour after Nick Jr., called CBBC on Nickelodeon. This block lasted until 1998. Nick Jr. was taken off the main channel in July 2000, after launching its own channel the year before, and the increase of subscribers to Sky Digital and cable.

By August 1997, Nickelodeon started signing on at 6am. When Sky Digital was launched in 1998, it was in the original channel line-up on Astra 2A, now broadcasting from 6am until 10pm. However, analogue satellite and analogue cable services continued to shutdown the channel at 7pm each day until Nickelodeon closed on analogue satellite on 30 April 2001. Nicktoons was launched in the UK and Ireland in July 2002.

During the end of 2004, Telewest failed to reach an agreement to broadcast Nickelodeon, Nicktoons and Nick Jr. on their services after 2005 and the channels were removed from Telewest on 17 December, leading to many Telewest customers leaving for Sky and NTL, while Telewest offered either a free upgrade to Disney Channel or to Sky Cinema to prevent loss of customers. By the next year, however, Nickelodeon successfully renegotiated with Telewest and the channels were restored.

In February 2010, Nickelodeon adopted the worldwide rebrand. The TeenNick block also adopted the identity of the American channel. In April 2010, Nicktoons and Nick Jr. took on their rebrand logos.

Nickelodeon HD was launched in October 2010 on Sky. Later, it was picked up by Virgin Media.

Since 1 January 2019, it broadcasts for 24 hours a day.

On 31 October 2022, Sky sold its stake in Nickelodeon UK, including Nickelodeon, to Paramount.

Ownership
Nickelodeon's UK operations was owned by Nickelodeon UK Ltd., which originally operated as a 50-50 joint venture between MTV Networks International and Kidsprog Ltd., a subsidiary of BSkyB formed solely for the launch of the channel. By 2005-2006 the stake was altered so MNA owned 60% and Sky owned 40%.

On October 31, 2022, Sky sold its stake in Nickelodeon UK Ltd., to Paramount International Networks, meaning they now own full control. The sale of the stake was so Sky could enter the children's market on their own with the launch of a stand-alone Sky Kids network, which they were not allowed to do due to the Nickelodeon joint-venture.

Subsidiary and sister channels

Nick Jr.

Nick Jr. first appeared in the UK and Ireland on 1 September 1993, between 9am – 12pm on weekday school days on the main Nickelodeon UK channel. It soon branched out to 10am - 2:30pm. In July 1999 it was announced Nick Jr would be given its own channel and was launched as a 14-hour (initially 13) standalone channel on analogue and digital pay TV on 1 September 1999 and subsequently the block was taken off Nickelodeon in July 2000 (but shortly reintroduced in 2005). Nick Jr. originally timeshared with MTV Dance when that channel launched in early 2001, though this ceased some time ago, with MTV Dance having gone 24 hours since then. Nick Jr. itself has broadcast for 24 hours since 2010.

Nick Jr. Too 

On 24 April 2006, Nick Jr. Too was launched under the name Nick Jr. 2. It broadcasts Nick Jr. shows on a different schedule from the main Nick Jr. channel. It has broadcast for 24 hours since 2015. 

Nick Jr. Too is sometimes being renamed as Nick Jr. Peppa, and Nick Jr. Paw Patrol.

Nicktoons

On 12 October 2004, Nicktoons was launched, airing Nicktoons, as well as other cartoons, throughout the day. It has broadcast for 24 hours since 1 January 2019.

in September 2022, the channel rebranded as Nick SpongeBob, airing SpongeBob SquarePants and The Patrick Star Show, then in October 2022, Nick SpongeBob changed to Nick Horrid Henry, only airing Horrid Henry, then changed back to Nicktoons in November 2022.

Nicktoons UK mainly airs imported programming from the US network. It's Pony (2020-2022) was created in the UK, but was produced for the American channel and premiered in the US market first.

Nick +1, Nicktoons Replay and Nick Jr. +1
On 1 September 1999, a one-hour time shift of Nickelodeon was initially launched on Sky. It is available on Sky 620, Virgin Media Ireland 605 and Virgin Media 713. The channel originally launched as Nick Replay but was rebranded as Nick +1 on 2 October 2012.

A one-hour timeshift of Nicktoons, Nicktoons Replay, was also available on Sky channel 630. The timeshift channel replaced the Nicktoons spin off sister channel Nicktoonsters.

Nick Jr. +1 launched on 2 October 2012, replacing Nicktoons Replay, which closed the previous day. The timeshift channel is available on Nicktoons Replay's previous space.

Nickelodeon Ireland
In 2004, The channel launched an Irish advertising feed for Nickelodeon.

An Irish feed for Nick Jr. was launched in 2006. On 13 September 2012, it was announced that Sky would be launching an Irish feed of NickToons on 16 October 2012. All Nickelodeon channels available in Ireland now host Irish advertising and sponsorship.

Nicktoonsters

On 18 August 2008, Nicktoonsters was launched. Its licence first appeared on the Ofcom website in September 2007 (initially named "Nicktoons 2", and changed to Nicktoonsters on 3 July 2008). The channel closed on 31 July 2009 and the next day was replaced by Nicktoons Replay.

Programming

Over the years the network has produced series including Genie in the House (2006–2009), Summer in Transylvania (2010–2012), Goldie’s Oldies (2021) and Overlord and the Underwoods (2021-). Apart from local continuity programming including Nickelodeon UK Kids' Choice Awards, Camp Orange and Nickelodeon Slimefest, Nickelodeon UK mainly airs imported programming from the US network. House of Anubis (2011-2013) were created in the UK, but were produced for the American channel and premiered in the US market first.

Kids' Choice Awards

Traditionally, the Kids' Choice Awards in the United Kingdom and Ireland before 2007 included only an airing of the original ceremony from the US. Nickelodeon UK from then on held a full ceremony for two years in 2007 and 2008 which included a fully local slate of categories and was held at the ExCeL London. No ceremony or UK-specific awards were held in 2009 after network budget cuts, and since 2010 only a few local categories are voted by children in the United Kingdom and Ireland, which are awarded each year by Nickelodeon presenters as continuity during the airing of the American ceremony on a one-day delay.

Nickelodeon Land

Nickelodeon Land is a section of the Blackpool Pleasure Beach resort in Blackpool which is a  section of the park featuring themed Nickelodeon attractions and souvenirs. The Nickelodeon Land section of the park opened in April 2011.

References

External links
 

UK and Ireland
Television channels and stations established in 1993
Children's television channels in the United Kingdom
Children's television channels in Ireland
Sky television channels
1993 establishments in the United Kingdom
Television channel articles with incorrect naming style
2004 establishments in Ireland